G-Aerosports Archon is one of the light aircraft types designed and built by G-Aerosports, an airplane manufacturer based in the city of Florina in Northern Greece

The plane has the configuration of a fifth-generation jet fighter  and its first version, the single-seat SF/1, made its first flight on June 11, 2009. 
It is offered for sale in a kit form (while two ready-to-fly copies have been produced); in 2020, an agreement was signed with Fisher Flying Products regarding its license production in Canada for the North American market.

The two-seat version SF-2T  made its first official flight on April 4, 2022, and is to be produced under license in Australia.

References

External links
Company website
Sportair USA (U.S. dealer for G-Aerosports) Archon website 
Archon SF/1 on Way to UK (Flyer Magazine)
Archon (Red Star.gr)  
Archon aircraft kit engineering
License production of Archon aircraft in Canada 
Archon at 2022 Oshkosh EAA AirVenture and license production

Aircraft manufacturers of Greece
Greek ultralight aircraft